is a town located in Akita, Japan. ,  the town had an estimated population of 5603 in 2465 households, and a population density of 330 persons per km². It is the smallest municipality in Akita Prefecture in terms of surface area.

Geography
Hachirōgata is located in the coastal flatlands northeastern Akita Prefecture, bordered by the remnant of Lake Hachirōgata which lies in the west of the town. Lake Hachirōgata was the second largest lake in Japan until it was drained in a land reclamation project from 1957 to 1977.The town is about 30 kilometers north of the prefectural capital at Akita City.

Neighboring municipalities
Akita Prefecture
Ikawa
Ōgata
Gojōme
Mitane

Climate
Hachirōgata has a Humid continental climate (Köppen climate classification Cfa) with large seasonal temperature differences, with warm to hot (and often humid) summers and cold (sometimes severely cold) winters. Precipitation is significant throughout the year, but is heaviest from August to October.  The average annual temperature in Hachirōgata  is 11.1 °C. The average annual rainfall is 1612 mm with September as the wettest month. The temperatures are highest on average in August, at around 24.8 °C, and lowest in January, at around -1.0 °C.

Demographics
Per Japanese census data, the population of Hachirōgata peaked at around the year 1950 and has been in steady decline since then.

History
The area of present-day Hachirōgata was part of ancient Dewa Province, dominated by the Satake clan during the Edo period, who ruled Kubota Domain under the Tokugawa shogunate. The village of Omogata was established in 1889 with the establishment of the modern municipalities system, the town of Hitoichi in 1925. The two merged in 1956 to form the town of Hachirōgata. Efforts to merge the town with neighboring Gojōme and Ikawa failed to pass a referendum in 2005.

Government
Hachirōgata has a mayor-council form of government with a directly elected mayor and a unicameral town council of 12 members. Hachirōgata, together with the other municipalities of Minamiakita District contributes one member to the Akita Prefectural Assembly. In terms of national politics, the town is part of Akita 2nd district of the lower house of the Diet of Japan.

Economy
The economy of Hachirōgata is based on agriculture and commercial fishing.

Education
Hachirōgata  has one public elementary schools and one public middle schools operated by the town government. The town does not have a high school.

Transportation

Railway
 East Japan Railway Company - Ōu Main Line

Highway
  Akita Expressway

Notable peoples
 Chiharu Shida, Japanese national badminton player

References

External links

Official Website 

 
Towns in Akita Prefecture